Mynydd y Lan is a 381-metre-high flat-topped hill in Caerphilly county borough in South Wales. It falls largely within the community of Ynysddu but its northern and eastern margins are within Crosskeys community. Its largely wooded southern and eastern flanks rise steeply from the Sirhowy and Ebbw valleys respectively. A wireless transmission station is located towards the northern end of the summit plateau. The current name is a possible corruption of Mynydd y Llan (mountain of the church), referencing the parish church of St Tudor, situated on its plateau. the church site has been occupied since the 5th century, with an early British site, being replaced by the Norman 11th century church.

Geology 
The hill is situated towards the southeastern margin of the South Wales Coalfield. The summit plateau and upper slopes of the hill are formed from sandstones of the Pennant Sandstone Formation assigned to the Warwickshire Group of the late Carboniferous Period.

Access 
The larger part of the hill including its flanking woodlands is mapped as open access under the Countryside and Rights of Way Act 2000 and thereby open to access on foot by the public. In addition a handful of public footpaths run through the woodlands providing additional access. One is followed by the Ebbw Valley Walk, another by the Raven Walk.

References

External links 
 images of Mynydd y Lan and area on Geograph website

Mountains and hills of Caerphilly County Borough
Marilyns of Wales